Iltis may refer to:
 Fred Iltis (1923-2008), an entomologist at San Jose State University, son of Hugo Iltis
 Hugh Iltis (1925-2016), a botanist at the University of Wisconsin–Madison, son of Hugo Iltis
 Hugo Iltis (1882-1952), a Czech-American biologist and professor at Mary Washington College
 Volkswagen Iltis, a military vehicle